Heinrich Karl Johann Hofmann  (13 January 1842, Berlin – 16 July 1902, Groß-Tabarz, present-day Thuringia) was a German composer and pianist. He was a pupil of Theodor Kullak, Eduard Grell, Siegfried Dehn and Richard Wüerst. His Frithjof Symphony (1874), a musical realization of the legend Friðþjófs saga hins frœkna, was one of the most frequently performed orchestral works in Germany during the late 19th century. In addition to orchestral music, he also wrote several operas, some lieder, choral music, and works for solo piano. After his death, his music fell largely into obscurity.

External links

1842 births
1902 deaths
19th-century German pianists
German opera composers
Male opera composers
Pupils of Siegfried Dehn
German male classical composers
German male pianists
19th-century German male musicians